The Scoundrel or The Grouch (German: Das Ekel) is a 1939 German comedy film,directed by Hans Deppe and starring Hans Moser, Josefine Dora and Herma Relin. It is based on the play The Scoundrel by Hans Reimann and Toni Impekoven, which had previously been made into a 1931 film.

Cast 
 Hans Moser as Karl Sträubler
 Josefine Dora as Karoline Sträubler
 Herma Relin as Leni Sträubler
 Josi Kleinpeter as Fritz Sträubler
 Hans Junkermann as Matthias Scheibler
 Kurt Meisel as Ferdinand Scheibler
 Fritz Kampers as August Weichert
 Hans Holt as Heinrich Weichert
 Else von Möllendorff as Gusti Pitzinger
 Ernst Waldow as Sperling
 Lotte Spira as Anna Weichert
 Leo Peukert as Anton Pitzinger
 Anton Pointner as Albert Hartung
 Julius Brandt as Richter
 Walter Schramm-Duncker as Vorsteher Specht
 Lena Haustein as Frieda, Köchin
 Otto Sauter-Sarto as Gefängniswärter
 Liesl Eckardt as Luftballonverkäuferin
 Harry Hardt as Kegelsbruders Lehrer
 Hans Waschatko as Direktor des Strassenbahngesellschaft
 Karl Harbacher as Kegelbruder
 Vincenz Prossl
 Edmund Pouch as Gerichtssekretär
 Hannes Schneider
 Hugo Flink

References

Bibliography 
 Hake, Sabine. Popular Cinema of the Third Reich. University of Texas Press, 2001.

External links 
 

1939 films
Films of Nazi Germany
German comedy films
1939 comedy films
1930s German-language films
German films based on plays
Films directed by Hans Deppe
Films set in Berlin
Remakes of German films
German black-and-white films
Tobis Film films
1930s German films